Jupiter is an American tugboat. It was built in Philadelphia in 1902 by Neafie & Levy for the Standard Oil Company of New York ("Socony"), and was named Socony No. 14. In 1939 it was sold to the Independent Pier Company in Philadelphia, and was renamed Jupiter. 

When  was launched in December 1942, Jupiter was one of the tugboats that helped move the massive battleship. Seventy-five years later, Jupiter participated in a ceremony to commemorate the anniversary of the launch (and of the attack on Pearl Harbor a year previously).

In 1949, Jupiter had an engine refit in Baltimore, converting it from steam to diesel power. In 1999 it was retired from work and was sold to the Penn's Landing Corporation. 

Jupiter is maintained and preserved by the Philadelphia Ship Preservation Guild, and is used for tourism.

References

External links
JUPITER - IMO 8134302
Socony 14 - (1902-1937)
Johnson's Steam Vessels of the Atlantic, Gulf and Pacific Coasts (1920): Standard Oil Co. of New York (technical data)

Ships built by Neafie and Levy
Museums in Philadelphia
Museum ships in Pennsylvania
1902 ships
Penn's Landing
Tugboats of the United States